Ambra Migliori (born 10 March 1984) is an Olympic butterfly swimmer from Italy. She swam for Italy at the 2004 Summer Olympics.

She is now teaching at a british international school in Shanghai.

She also swam for Italy at the:
2005 FINA World Championships
2005 Mediterranean Games

References

1984 births
Living people
Italian female butterfly swimmers
Olympic swimmers of Italy
Swimmers at the 2004 Summer Olympics
Universiade medalists in swimming
Mediterranean Games gold medalists for Italy
Mediterranean Games medalists in swimming
Swimmers at the 2005 Mediterranean Games
Universiade bronze medalists for Italy
Medalists at the 2009 Summer Universiade